
The following is a list of Playboy Playmates of 1962.  Playboy magazine names its Playmate of the Month each month throughout the year.

January

Merle Pertile (November 23, 1941 – November 28, 1997) was an American model and actress.  She was Playboy magazine's Playmate of the Month for its January 1962 issue. Her centerfold was photographed by Frank Bez.

According to The Playmate Book, Pertile died on November 28, 1997. The cause of death was complications following heart surgery.

February

Kari Knudsen (born January 17, 1939) is a Norwegian model.  She was Playboy magazine's Playmate of the Month for its February 1962 issue. Her centerfold was photographed by Justin Kerr and Barbara Kerr.

March

Pamela Gordon (born Pamela Anne Gordon; February 10, 1943) is a Canadian model and actress.  She was Playboy magazine's Playmate of the Month for its March 1962 issue. Her centerfold was photographed by Mario Casilli and Ken Honey.

Gordon went on to work as a Bunny at the Chicago Playboy Club. She also was named one of the top Canadians of 1962 by Liberty magazine.

April

Roberta Lane (born March 14, 1943) is an American model. She was Playboy magazine's Playmate of the Month for its April 1962 issue. Her centerfold was photographed by Frank Eck.

May

Marya Carter (born Zella Maria Grajeda; May 12, 1942) is an American model and actress.  She was Playboy magazine's Playmate of the month for its May 1962 issue. Her centerfold was photographed by Paul Morton Smith.

During the 1960s and 70s, Carter pursued an acting career, mostly appearing in B-movies and guest roles on television. She was married to Steve Ihnat, a character actor; they had two children. Ihnat died in 1972 of a heart attack.

June

Merissa Mathes (born Marrisa Mathes; January 26, 1940) is an American actress and model.  She was Playboy magazine's Playmate of the Month for its June 1962 issue. Her centerfold was photographed by Glenn Otto.

During the early to mid-1960s, she pursued an acting career, appearing in B-movies and series television. She appeared in Bernard McEveety's 1966 Ride Beyond Vengeance. She also had a small role the next year in Martin Scorsese's film directing debut, Who's That Knocking at My Door.

July

Unne Terjesen (born March 20, 1943) is a Norwegian model who is best known for being Playboy magazine's Playmate of the Month for its July 1962 issue. Her centerfold was photographed by Mario Casilli.

August

Jan Roberts (born June 9, 1939) is a former American model who was Playboy magazine's Playmate of the Month for its August 1962 issue. Her centerfold was photographed by Pompeo Posar. She also appeared in the issues for January 1963, July 1963, October 1964, and August 1966.

September

Mickey Winters (born September 30, 1940) is an American model who was Playboy magazine's Playmate of the Month for its September 1962 issue. Her centerfold was photographed by Don Bronstein.

October

Laura Young (May 22, 1938 – November 27, 1999) was an American model. She was Playboy magazine's Playmate of the Month for its October 1962 issue. Her centerfold was photographed by Pompeo Posar. She was a finalist for that year's Playmate of the Year title.

Young died of cancer on November 27, 1999.

November

Avis Kimble (born October 18, 1944) is an American model.  At age 17 she was photographed by Jon Pownall to become Playboy magazine's Playmate of the Month for its November 1962 issue, and was a finalist for the Playmate of the Year 1963 title.

December

June Cochran (February 20, 1943 – May 20, 2004) was an American model and beauty queen.  Cochran won the Miss Indiana USA pageant in 1960.  She was Playboy magazine's Playmate of the Month for December 1962, and Playmate of the Year for 1963. Her original pictorial was photographed by Don Bronstein.

See also
 List of people in Playboy 1960–1969

References

1962-related lists
1962
Playmates Of 1962